Edward Alberts Delker (April 17, 1906May 14, 1997) was a former Major League Baseball infielder. Delker made his debut for the St. Louis Cardinals on April 18, 1929. After playing for the Cardinals in parts of three major league seasons, his contract was purchased by the Philadelphia Phillies in 1932. In 1933, Delker was traded by the Phillies to the Cardinals with Spud Davis for Jimmy Wilson, but never played another major league game.

References 

1906 births
1997 deaths
Major League Baseball second basemen
Baseball players from Pennsylvania
Philadelphia Phillies players
St. Louis Cardinals players
People from Schuylkill County, Pennsylvania